Andrés Alexander Flores Mejía (born 31 August 1990) is a Salvadoran professional football manager and former player. He is the current assistant coach of Portland Timbers 2 in the MLS Next Pro.

Club career
Nicknamed Ruso, Flores was signed by top Argentine side River Plate and played for River Plate's Reserves team in 2006–2008. He impressed in Argentina, but was unable to stay due to his age.

Upon returning to El Salvador he signed with A.D. Isidro Metapán in 2009. During his time with the club Metapán enjoyed the greatest period in its history capturing four domestic titles, the last one in December 2011.

On 29 January 2012, Flores signed to first division Danish club Viborg FF. Due to injury he only played one league game, but played several games in the Danish Cup, where he scored two goals. He did not renew his contract with Viborg and went back to El Salvador to play with Metapán.

New York Cosmos
On 18 July 2014, the New York Cosmos announced that Flores would be signed on loan from Turín FESA F.C. The 23-year-old made his first appearance for the New York Cosmos on 2 August 2014 in a 1–0 loss against the Carolina RailHawks.

On 9 August 2014, Flores scored his first goal for the Cosmos in a 2–1 win over the Atlanta Silverbacks. Flores battled a hamstring injury towards the end of the season and finished the year with one goal and one assist in eight appearances (seven starts) for the Cosmos. Flores also earned NASL Fall Team of the Week honors twice (Week 5, Week 13).

Flores earned multiple call-ups to the El Salvador national team while with the Cosmos including to Copa Centoramericana and multiple friendly matches.

In the 2015 NASL season, Flores started 11 times in 20 appearances, logging 1,044 minutes, while picking up three goals and three assists.

Portland Timbers
In January 2018, Flores signed with Portland Timbers of Major League Soccer. Portland declined their contract option on Flores following the 2020 season.

Rio Grande Valley FC
On 27 August 2021, Flores signed with USL Championship side Rio Grande Valley FC.

He announced his retirement from professional football at the age of 31 on February 23, 2022.

Coaching career
On February 24 2022, a day after announcing his retirement, Flores was appointed as an assistant coach of Portland Timbers 2.

International career
Flores started playing for the U-15 national team, and has been an essential player in the youth national teams.  In 2008, El Salvador's manager Carlos de los Cobos called the young Flores to train with the senior team. He made his debut for El Salvador in a March 2008 friendly match against Trinidad & Tobago but was overlooked from May 2008 on, only to be recalled for a September 2010 friendly against Honduras. Flores took part at the 2011 CONCACAF Gold Cup. He was subbed-on at the 78th minute in exchange for Léster Blanco in a friendly on 7 August 2011 against Venezuela.
Flores was named as the captain of the El Salvador squad for 2014 Copa Centroamericana. Flores started four matches for El Salvador during the tournament and led the team to an overall record of 2–0–2 (W-D-L) and a fourth-place finish in the tournament.

In August 2018, Flores became a United States citizen.

International caps and goals
El Salvador's goal tally first.

Honours

Club
 A.D. Isidro Metapán
 Primera División de Fútbol de El Salvador (4): Clausura 2009, Clausura 2010, Apertura 2010, Apertura 2011
 Copa Mesoamericana: Runner-up (1): 2011
 New York Cosmos
 Soccer Bowl (2): 2015, 2016

References

External links

 El Grafico Profile
 
 New York Cosmos profile

1990 births
Living people
Sportspeople from San Salvador
Association football forwards
Salvadoran footballers
El Salvador international footballers
Salvadoran expatriate footballers
Club Atlético River Plate footballers
A.D. Isidro Metapán footballers
2011 Copa Centroamericana players
2011 CONCACAF Gold Cup players
2013 Copa Centroamericana players
2013 CONCACAF Gold Cup players
2014 Copa Centroamericana players
2015 CONCACAF Gold Cup players
2017 Copa Centroamericana players
2017 CONCACAF Gold Cup players
Viborg FF players
Expatriate men's footballers in Denmark
New York Cosmos (2010) players
Expatriate soccer players in the United States
North American Soccer League players
2009 CONCACAF U-20 Championship players
Portland Timbers players
Major League Soccer players
2019 CONCACAF Gold Cup players
Portland Timbers 2 players
Rio Grande Valley FC Toros players
USL Championship players
Salvadoran emigrants to the United States